The 47 prefectures of Japan, which form the first level of jurisdiction and administrative division of Japan, consist of 43   proper, two , one  and one . 
The Meiji Fuhanken sanchisei administration created the first prefectures to replace the provinces of Japan in 1868.

List of prefectures
The following list contains the etymology of each current prefecture. The default alphabetic order in this sortable table can be altered to mirror the traditional Japanese regions and ISO parsing.

See also 
Japanese exonyms
Prefectures of Japan

References

Bibliography

External links
http://www.nationsonline.org/oneworld/japan_prefectures.htm
http://www.gojapango.com/travel/japanese_prefectures_list.htm
http://www.japanstyle.info/11/entry10430.html

Japan
Japan prefectures
Prefectural name
 Etymologies
Regions of Japan
Etymologies